was a Japanese mathematician, known for his work in proof theory.

After graduating from Tokyo University, he went to Princeton to study under Kurt Gödel. 
 
He later became a professor at the University of Illinois at Urbana–Champaign. Takeuti was president (2003–2009) of the Kurt Gödel Society, having worked on the book Memoirs of a Proof Theorist: Godel and Other Logicians.  His goal was to prove the consistency of the real numbers.  To this end, Takeuti's conjecture speculates that a sequent formalisation of second-order logic has cut-elimination.  He is also known for his work on ordinal diagrams with Akiko Kino.

Publications 

 2013 Dover reprint

Notes

External links 

Presidents of the Kurt Gödel Society
Takeuti Symposium (contains relevant birthdate information)

1926 births
2017 deaths
Japanese logicians
Japanese philosophers
Proof theorists
University of Tokyo alumni
University of Illinois Urbana-Champaign faculty